Parinaquta may refer to:

 Parinaquta (Carabaya), a lake in Peru
 Parinaquta (Chucuito), a lake in Peru